The Trentino-Alto Adige/Südtirol regional election of 1973 took place on 18 November 1973.

The administration DC-SVP was expanded with the Democratic Socialists and the Republicans.

The council was greatly expanded to 70 seats.

Results

Regional Council

Source: Trentino-Alto Adige/Südtirol Region

Province of Trento

Source: Trentino-Alto Adige/Südtirol Region

Province of Bolzano

Source: Trentino-Alto Adige/Südtirol Region

Elections in Trentino-Alto Adige/Südtirol
1973 elections in Italy